Jefferson Alan McKnight (February 18, 1963 – March 1, 2015) was an American utility man in Major League Baseball who played for the New York Mets and Baltimore Orioles in parts of six seasons spanning 1989–1994. McKnight was able to play all positions except center field and pitcher, making the largest number of appearances as a first baseman with 39. He was the son of former major league player Jim McKnight.

McKnight played college baseball at Westark Community College, which later became the University of Arkansas-Fort Smith. 

McKnight's professional career overall spanned 16 years. Originally drafted by the Mets in 1983, he finished his career in 1998 with the independent Newark Bears. He batted .171 in 16 appearances with the Orioles and .383 in 22 games for the Rochester Red Wings during the 1991 season before his release on October 16 of that year.

He died in 2015 at the age of 52 due to leukemia, a disease he was battling for 10 years.

See also
 List of second-generation Major League Baseball players

References

External links
, or Retrosheet, or Pura Pelota (Venezuelan Winter League)

1963 births
2015 deaths
Arkansas Razorbacks baseball players
Baltimore Orioles players
Baseball players from Arkansas
Columbia Mets players
Columbia Mules players
Deaths from cancer in Arkansas
Deaths from leukemia
Jackson Mets players
Little Falls Mets players
Lynchburg Mets players
Major League Baseball infielders
Navegantes del Magallanes players
American expatriate baseball players in Venezuela
New York Mets players
Newark Bears players
Norfolk Tides players
People from Conway, Arkansas
Rochester Red Wings players
Tidewater Tides players
University of Arkansas alumni